Guides to Growing Up is an album by jazz pianist Horace Silver, his first released on the Silverto label, featuring performances by Silver with Eddie Harris, Joe Diorio, Bob Magnusson, and Roy McCurdy, with recitations by Bill Cosby and vocals by Weaver Copeland, and Mahmu Pearl.

In a 1981 interview Silver stated: "This is jazz, and actually it's adult music. But it's music for everybody. And adults can listen to it and enjoy it as well as the kids! But the titles of the tunes and the lyrics and recitation is dedicated to the kids, so they can listen to and learn good principles of life."

Track listing
All compositions and lyrics by Horace Silver
 "Accepting Responsibility"
 "Reaching Our Goals in Life"
 "Learning to Be Unselfish"
 "Helping Others"
 "Finding Good Rules to Live By"
 "Honesty and Self Control"
 "Managing Your Money"
 "The Things That Really Matter"
Recorded in NYC on September 18 & 29, 1981.

Personnel
Horace Silver - piano
Eddie Harris - tenor saxophone
Joe Diorio - guitar
Bob Magnusson - bass
Roy McCurdy - drums
Bill Cosby - recitation
Weaver Copeland, Mahmu Pearl - vocals

References

Horace Silver albums
Silverto Records albums
1981 albums